First Sergeant Charles H. DePuy (September 8, 1842 to January 6, 1935) was an American soldier who fought in the American Civil War. DePuy received the country's highest award for bravery during combat, the Medal of Honor, for his action during the Battle of the Crater in Petersburg, Virginia on 30 July 1864. He was honored with the award on 30 July 1896.

Biography
DePuy was born in Sherman, Michigan on 8 September 1842. He enlisted into the 1st Michigan Sharpshooters. He died on 6 January 1935 and his remains are interred at the Evergreen Cemetery in Michigan.

Medal of Honor citation

See also

List of American Civil War Medal of Honor recipients: A–F

References

External links

1842 births
1935 deaths
People of Michigan in the American Civil War
Union Army officers
United States Army Medal of Honor recipients
American Civil War recipients of the Medal of Honor